Interossei refer to muscles between certain bones.  There are many interossei in a human body. Specific interossei include:

On the hands
 Dorsal interossei muscles of the hand
 Palmar interossei muscles

On the feet
Dorsal interossei muscles of the foot
Plantar interossei muscles

Muscular system